The city of Ottawa, Canada held municipal elections on December 6, 1948.

Mayor of Ottawa

Ottawa Board of Control
(4 elected)

Ottawa City Council
(2 elected from each ward)

References
Ottawa Citizen, December 7, 1948

Municipal elections in Ottawa
1948 elections in Canada
1940s in Ottawa
1948 in Ontario
December 1948 events in Canada